Butterwick is a village and former civil parish about 6 miles from Pickering, now in the parish of Barton-le-Street, in the Ryedale district, in the county of North Yorkshire, England. In 1961 the parish had a population of 41. Butterwick has a church called Holy Epiphany.

History 
The name "Butterwick" means 'Butter (specialised) farm'. Butterwick was Butruic in the 11th century, Buterwic in the 12th century and Boterwik in the 14th century. Butterwick was formerly a township in the parish of Barton-le-Street, in 1866 Butterwick became a civil parish in its own right.

References 

Villages in North Yorkshire
Former civil parishes in North Yorkshire
Ryedale